Franz Xaver Krückl, occasionally also Franz Krückel or Franz Krükl, (10 November 1841, Nový Šaldorf-Sedlešovice – 12 January 1899, Strasbourg) was an Austrian operatic baritone, stage actor, composer and music educator of Moravian origin.

Life 
Krückl was born in Nový Šaldorf-Sedlešovice, South Moravian Region. Already as a child, Krückl sang in the church choir of his home town. On the recommendation of his town priest, he came to Vienna in 1851 to apply to the Hofkapelle. But only after two refusals he was appointed by decree of August 1855 as k.k. österreichischer Hofkapell-Sängerknaben. He was also taught composition together with basso continuo and counterpoint.

Krückl's first attempts at theatre also date from this time at the grammar school; first in purely school events, later he also took on smaller extra roles in "real" productions. He was also deeply impressed by the model performances of the Hofkapelle and the Vienna Tonkünstler Society. These experiences led to Krückl's first compositions, including a mass, which was first performed on 8 November 1856 in the parish church of Klosterbruck, including Gradual and Offertory.

After obtaining his Matura (Abitur), Krückl began studying at the University of Vienna in 1858. In 1863, he completed his studies with a doctorate. Immediately afterwards, he found a job in the civil service. He resigned this position the following year and became a partner in a Viennese law firm.

He later took acting lessons with court actor Joseph Wagner. In 1868, Krückl resigned all his mandates and gave up his profession as a lawyer. With the help and support of his two teachers he was able to make his very successful debut as "Ashton" at the city theatre of Brünn on March 10, 1868.

From there, he was brought to the Staatstheater Kassel, where he appeared for the first time on 12 May 1868. In 1871, Krückl changed to the Stadttheater Augsburg and worked there until 1874; occasionally he was a director.

In 1874, he went to the Hamburg State Opera for seven years. There, he made the acquaintance of Angelo Neumann, who engaged him for his travelling Wagner-Ensemble (between 1882 and 1883 over 130 Ring-performances in 58 cities).

In 1883, Krückl left Hamburg and settled in Frankfurt. There, he was entrusted with a teaching position at the Hoch Conservatory until 1892. In the summer of 1892, he became artistic director at the Straßburg city theatre where he could celebrate his 25th anniversary on 12 May of the following year .

Shortly after his 58th birthday, Krückl died on 12 January 1899 in Strasbourg, where he also found his final resting place.

Publications 
 Das deutsche Theater und sein gesetzlicher Schutz. Eine Denkschrift. Genossenschaft Dt. Bühnenangehöriger, Berlin, 1882.

Roles 
 Ashton – Lucia di Lammermoor (Gaetano Donizetti) 
 Carlos – Ernani (Giuseppe Verdi) 
 Luna – Il trovatore (Giuseppe Verdi)

Students 
 Robert Bartram, Rudolf Moest

References

External links

Austrian stage actors
Austrian operatic baritones
Austrian composers
Voice teachers
1841 births
1899 deaths
People from Znojmo District
19th-century Austrian male opera singers